Coleophora irroratella is a moth of the family Coleophoridae. It is found in the United States, including California.

The larvae feed on the leaves of Crataegus species. They create a tubular leaf case.

References

irroratella
Moths described in 1882
Moths of North America